Harman Technology, trading as Ilford Photo, is a UK-based manufacturer of photographic materials known worldwide for its ILFORD branded black-and-white film, papers and chemicals. Historically it also published the Ilford Manual of Photography, a comprehensive manual of everything photographic, including the optics, physics and chemistry of photography, along with recipes for many developers. 

Under the ownership of the industrial conglomerate ICI in the 1960s, the company produced a range of Ilfochrome (Cibachrome) and Ilfocolor colour printing materials at a new plant in Switzerland developed in partnership with the Swiss company CIBA-Geigy, which later acquired ICIs shares. By the 2000s, as the UK - Swiss company Ilford Imaging, the decline of the film market saw the UK company in receivership by 2004, but rescued by a management buy out; Harman Technology Ltd, which today continues the production of traditional black-and-white photographic materials, under the ILFORD, Kentmere and Harman brands.

The ILFORD brand is also shared with the remnant of the former Swiss arm of the company, Ilford Imaging Europe, which applies it to a range of inkjet papers and a disposable colour film camera, but other than a common heritage there is now no connection between the two companies.

History

Britannia Works Company

The company was founded in 1879 by Alfred Hugh Harman as the Britannia Works Company. Initially making photographic plates, it grew to occupy a large site in the centre of Ilford.

Ilford Ltd 
In 1902, it took the name of the town to become Ilford Limited, despite the objections of the local council. Production of roll films commenced in 1912 and the Mobberley (Rajar) factory was acquired in 1928. In 1903 Ilford Ltd., manufacturers of photographic dry-plates, extended their operations, in Great Warley, Brentwood. The company acquired a 14 acre site, adjacent to Woodman Road and planned to provide employment for 350 people. The works were enlarged in later years, and in the mid 1920s this branch became Selo Ltd , a major new manufacturing site was developed in Woodman Road, Brentwood, Essex, known locally as "Selo Works". The marketing name Selo, for roll films, first appeared in 1930.

In 1959, ICI acquired a majority share holding in Ilford. In 1963 Ciba AG, Switzerland, who had bought Lumiere, France, the preceding year, and who already owned Swiss photographic coating company Tellko, began to acquire shares in ILFORD as part of a commercial co-operation between Ciba and ILFORD to develop Ciba's dye-bleach print material (for making prints directly from colour transparencies). Originally called Cilchrome ('Cil' derived from the names Ciba, ILFORD and Lumière) the eventual product name was Cibachrome.

Ciba built a new plant in Marly, Switzerland, to coat Cibachrome (renamed ILFOCHROME in 1992 after Ciba withdrew use of their name). The old Tellko factory nearby in the centre of Fribourg was used as the finishing department.

In 1969 Ciba acquired all ICI shares in ILFORD to become sole owner of ILFORD Limited. A year later Ciba merged with JR Geigy to become Ciba-Geigy. In 1983, their UK headquarters was moved to Mobberley, Cheshire.

Ilford Anitec
In 1989, Ciba-Geigy sold Ilford to USA-based International Paper company, also owners of graphic arts materials manufacturer Anitec. The two companies were merged in 1990 to become Ilford Anitec. In 1996, the sales and administration offices were also moved from London to Mobberley. In the same year, the Selo Works site, in Brentwood, was closed and sold off for housing development.

Ilford Imaging
In 1997 Ilford Anitec was sold onto Doughty Hanson & Co a British private equity fund manager and subsequently rebranded ILFORD Imaging. In 2002 plans were announced to redevelop the original part of the factory (former Rajar works) for housing to release funds to re-invest in the business, with the housing subsequently constructed in 2004–07.

On 20 August 2004, after earlier that year celebrating 125 years of photographic manufacture, the UK company (ILFORD Imaging UK Limited) went into receivership with debts of £40m.  The Swiss manufacturing site and distribution companies was put up for sale as a going concern.

The Swiss part of the company; Ilford Imaging Switzerland GmbH, and the plant at Marly was bought by the Oji Paper Company of Japan in July 2005. It produced inkjet products and high quality colour photographic products. It was subsequently sold onto Paradigm Global Partners LLP in May 2010 before being declared bankrupt on 9 December 2013 resulting in the closure of the Marly plant.

The 'Ilford Imaging' and ‘ILFORD’ brand and trademarks (but not the Marly plant) was acquired by a joint venture of Australian firm CR Kennedy & Company Pty Ltd and the Japan-based Chugai Photo Chemical Company named ILFORD Imaging Europe GmbH now based in Germany. The Galerie range of inkjet papers was relaunched in August 2014. The company holds the rights to the 'ILFORD' trademark for photographic applications but otherwise has no connection to Ilford Photo.

The Marly site is now 'Marly Innovation Centre' with alternate uses found for the original buildings. In 2015, Fotoimpex owners of the ADOX photographic brand and a small scale photographic factory outside Berlin acquired use of the former Ilford Imaging (Ciba Geigy) machine E, medium scale coating line at Marly, with the intention to begin coating ADOX film there in 2018.

Harman Technology

2004–2015 
The UK site was subject to a management buyout by 6 former managers of Ilford Imaging UK Limited, which resulted in the formation of Harman Technology Ltd (named after the founder Alfred Harman) in February 2005. The company, now traded as Ilford Photo, produced high quality monochrome photographic products. The Ilford brand was retained by Ilford Imaging Europe GmbH and used under licence by Ilford Photo for its existing film products. To finance the purchase, the Mobberley factory site was sold to Isola Investments Ltd, a wholly owned subsidiary of the Perviaz Naviede Family Trust with Ilford Photo remaining as tenant.

In 2007, Harman Technology acquired Kentmere Photographic Limited, a manufacturer of photographic paper in Kentmere, Lake District. Production is moved to Mobberley and in 2009 two new classic grain B&W films are added under the Kentmere brand.  Originally designed as a lower priced brand to their Ilford offer to compete in the US market they are now available worldwide with the Kentmere brand particularly aimed at the student market and those new to black and white photography. Harman also contract manufacture similar black and white films for other brands including AgfaPhoto (APX), Rollei (RPX), Oriental (Seagull).

In 2012, the company invested £350,000 in a 35mm film cassette making plant, bringing production back in house after relying on external suppliers for 50 years to provide long term surety of supply. The company was also noted as having an 80% share of the black and white photographic market.

In 2014, land owners of the 40 acre Mobberley site submitted a planning application to Cheshire East Council to construct 375 homes on the majority of the site including investment to consolidate Ilford Photo operations onto a smaller 7.5 acre campus within the site. The application was refused and an appeal was made to the planning inspectorate in July 2015. Following a public inquiry in 2016, the appeal was rejected.

2015 – present 
On 14 September 2015, ten years on from the original management buy out, Ilford Photo announced that Harman Technology Limited had been acquired by Pemberstone Ventures Limited for an 'undisclosed amount'.

In 2017 the Ilford Lab Direct service, operating from the factory site in the UK was re-named HARMAN Lab.

In May 2018, the company announced a refresh of their existing Ilford film packaging, with Kentmere film packaging refreshed in September 2018. Both sets of packaging now feature a contrasting Harman Technology sub branding. In December 2018, they launched 'Simplicity' a new range of B&W development chemicals packed in small sachets designed to process 2x135 or 1x120 format films to improve convenience for new or low volume users.

In 2019 Ilford celebrated its 140th year with a 'Silver Ticket Competition' one winning ticket for a factory tour and photographic course being hidden in a 140th anniversary film box and in October the announcement of a number of new products following a teaser campaign on social media. This included Ilford Multigrade V RC Deluxe photographic paper available in Glossy, Pearl and Satin finishes, ORTHO PLUS film in 135 and 120 formats, an Ilford and Paterson film processing starter kit and a Harman reusable camera supplied with 2x 35mm Kentmere Pan 400 films. In 2021 Harman introduced the EZ-35 35mm motorized film camera with a fixed focus 31mm, f/11 lens packaged with a roll of HP5 plus.

Ilford products

Film 

 Pan F Plus 50 (extremely fine grain)
 FP4 Plus 125
 HP5 Plus 400
 Delta 100, 400, and 3200
 XP2 Super 400
 SFX 200
 Ortho Plus 80
Consumer grade, selected markets
 Ilford PAN 100 
 Ilford PAN 400

Film developers 

 Ilford ID-11
 Ilfosol 3
 Ilfotec DD, DD-X, HC, LC 29, and RT Rapid
 Microphen
 Perceptol
 Phenisol
 Simplicity Developer

Fixers, toners and other chemicals 

 Hypam fixer
 Ilford 2000 RT Fixer and Rapid Fixer
 Ilfostop
 Ilfotol wetting agent
 Ilford Washaid
 Harman Selenium Toner
 Simplicity Stop
 Simplicity Fix

Other 

 Ilford + Paterson film processing starter kit

Paper 

Graded
 Ilfospeed RC Deluxe
 Ilfobrom Galerie FB Grade 3

Variable contrast
 Multigrade V RC Deluxe (2019)
 Multigrade V RC Portfolio (2021)
 Multigrade RC Cooltone
 Multigrade RC Warmtone
 Multigrade RC Express
 Multigrade FB Art 300 (Rag base)
 Multigrade FB Classic (Replaces Multigrade IV FB, Dec 2013)
 Multigrade FB Cooltone (new, Dec 2013)
 Multigrade FB Warmtone

Digital Panchromatic
 Ilfospeed RC Digital
 Galerie FB Digital (special order)

Direct Positive
 HARMAN Direct Positive – FB Glossy
 HARMAN Direct Positive – RC Glossy & Luster

Paper developers 

 Bromophen
 Harman Warmtone Developer
 Ilford 2150 XL and 2000 RT
 Multigrade developer
 PQ Universal

Specialist products 

 Nuclear emulsions
 L4 Plates
 Q plates
 Process control

Kentmere products

Film 

 Kentmere PAN 100 (named Kentmere 100 until late 2018)
 Kentmere PAN 400 (named Kentmere 400 until late 2018)

Paper 
Variable contrast
 Kentmere VC Select Lustre 
 Kentmere VC Select Glossy

Harman products

Cameras 
 Obscura Pinhole Camera
 Harman Titan Pinhole Camera
 Harman HP5+ Single Use Camera
 Harman XP2 Single Use Camera
 Harman reusable Camera with 2 Kentmere Pan 400 films (from 2019)
 Harman EZ 35 motorised film camera with HP5 plus (from 2021)

Inkjet Papers 
 Harman Crystal Jet Elite

Discontinued Products

Cameras 
Ilford sold a number of cameras under its own name but made for it by other manufacturers, starting with a 'box' camera in 1902, but most were made in the 1940s and 50s. The Ilford Witness was a rangefinder camera with interchangeable lenses announced in 1947, but not released until 1953 because of manufacturing difficulties (example shown in Science Museum Collections )  . In the meantime, the simpler Advocate series 1 was released in 1949   and series 2 in 1952. A pre-release Advocate series 1 camera was given to Princess Elizabeth in 1948 ( was unique in having an ivory enamel finish, example in Science Museum Collections ) It was stolen, but later recovered when it was sent to be repaired. Also released in 1949 was the Craftsman, a twin-lens reflex (TLR) which took 120 or 620 film. Then 1951 saw the Prentice folding camera which also took 120 film.

In 1957, Ilford released the Sportsman, a relabelled West German Dacora Dignette, as a lightly built and cheap 35 mm camera to compete with the better made and more expensive Kodak Retinette. In Germany, a comparative Dignette was about half the price of a Retinette, both coming from the Stuttgart – Black Forest area. The Sportsman became a series of camera models produced over the following 10 years, including the Super Sporti Camera, in 1960 . In 1958, Ilford released the Monobar, a monorail camera manufactured by Kennedy Instruments with a 35 mm back that resembled the earlier Advocate camera (which KI had also manufactured). The Monobar allowed the front (lens) and rear (film plane) of the camera to be moved and rotated, bringing the scheimpflug principle to the 35mm world.

Film
 Surveillance film
 Traffic surveillance film

XP2 Super Development 
Unlike most other black and white films, XP2 Super can be processed in the same chemicals as colour print film (colour C41 Process).  It produces a monochrome (black & white) negative, despite the development process.

Custom film sizing 
Whilst Ilford offers its film products in a wide range of common film formats; including 135, 120 and sheet film sizes, there are many more historic sizes that are no longer produced. To assist photographers and artists requiring these and other sizes, since 2005 Ilford Photo has organised via select  retailers an annual ultra large, custom and specialist format ordering scheme, similar to a group buying scheme. Customers orders are placed in advance and if there is sufficient demand for a film product to justify conversion to that size the orders are fulfilled.

Lab services 
In January 2008, the Ilford Process and Print Service (formerly Ilford Premium Direct) was brought in-house to the manufacturing site in Mobberley, Cheshire, UK. the following year Ilford Photo re-launched the in-house black-and-white lab service as "Ilford Lab Direct". The mail order service offers black-and-white film processing and silver gelatin printing from film or from digital files. The launch saw the introduction of a dedicated website 

The service has continued to expand offering Medium and Large format processing and Digital Black and white Lightjet prints.

In 2009, Ilford Lab Direct was awarded a Gold Award by Digital Photo magazine "Best online Black and White Printer".

In August 2013 Ilford Lab Direct US was launched, operating from California, US and offering a similar service to the UK operation.

In 2017 the Service was renamed HARMAN Lab and now trades under this name.

HARMAN Lab (UK Service) www.harmanlab.com

HARMAN Lab (US Service) www.harmanlab-us.com

See also 

 Photographic film 
 List of photographic films
 List of discontinued photographic films
 Photographic paper
 Darkroom

References

External links 
 ILFORD photo
 HARMAN Technology
 HARMAN Lab
 HARMAN Lab US
 CR Kennedy & Company Pty Ltd

Photography companies of the United Kingdom
Photographic film makers
Chemical industry in London
Photography in the United Kingdom
Companies established in 1876